Otto Albrecht Alfred von Bolschwing (15 October 1909 – 7 March 1982) was a German SS- in the Nazi  (SD), Hitler's SS intelligence agency. After World War II von Bolschwing became a spy and worked for the Central Intelligence Agency (CIA) in Europe and later in California.

Life
Otto Albrecht von Bolschwing was born in Schönbruch, District of Bartenstein, East Prussia (now: Szczurkowo, Poland) on October 15, 1909. He was descended from the aristocratic . He was educated at the University of Breslau and the University of London. He joined the Nazi Party in April 1932 and after the Nazis came to power the following year he became a member of the SS. Bolschwing was assigned to the foreign intelligence section of the Sicherheitsdienst (SD) and worked as an undercover agent in Mandatory Palestine, exchanging promises of encouraging young Jews to emigrate for intelligence about the British supplied by the Haganah. He was closely associated with Adolf Eichmann, became his adjutant, and had some involvement in the planning of the Final Solution. In 1937 he wrote a memorandum concerning Jewish emigration, referencing the anti-Jewish riots in Berlin in 1935:

His report suggested bureaucratic methods such as economic restrictions, special taxes, and passport denials to purge Germany of its Jews. Heinrich Himmler was impressed with the report, and assigned von Bolschwing to work under Adolf Eichmann. Over the following years, von Bolschwing wrote dozens of memos and reports on how to persecute Jews. His suggestions to Eichmann included confiscating money from Jews, labeling them on their passports, and allowing Jews to leave Germany but not to return. Rather than advocating the mass murder of Jews, he proposed making their lives so terrifying and unbearable that they would voluntarily leave Germany.

Later, von Bolschwing became the representative of the SD at the German embassy in Bucharest, Romania, where he organised an anti-Jewish pogrom with the Iron Guard in 1941, in which 125 Jews were killed. He was promoted to the rank of SS-Hauptsturmführer (captain) on 30 January 1941. After returning to Germany in March 1941 Bolschwing pursued to a career in business, becoming a partner with the Bank voor Onroerende Zaken, an Amsterdam-based bank which played a role in the confiscation of assets belonging to Jewish citizens in the Nazi-occupied Netherlands.

According to Eric Lichtblau, von Bolschwing's actions were not motivated by antisemitism so much as by the desire for power and wealth. Lichtblau noted that in the midst of the Holocaust, von Bolschwing married a half-Jewish woman.

Post-war
Before the end of World War II in 1945, von Bolschwing had already been recruited as a mole by the American Counter Intelligence Corps (CIC), the counter-espionage arm of the U.S. Army, which was later merged into the CIA. It has been speculated that this was because he recognized Nazi Germany was about to lose the war, and decided to spy for what he knew would be the winning side. Already in spring 1945, he was working for them in Salzburg. According to the CIA he was one of their highest-ranking spymasters in Europe. He provided intelligence on Nazi colleagues and German military operations. In 1949, he joined the Gehlen Organization and mobilized former contacts in Italy in order to influence the events of the Greek Civil War, while providing intelligence of possible subversion by Soviet Bloc intelligence services. After being expelled for ineptitude and insubordination, he again began working for the CIA, running an anti-Soviet spy network composed of ex-Nazis in Austria.

During this period, the CIA's knowledge of von Bolscwhing's Nazi past was limited. He admitted to having been a card-carrying member of Nazi Party, but claimed that he only joined it as a way of getting government approval for a cement factory he wanted to build in East Prussia, and that he had tried to thwart Hitler. Some CIA officials had doubts about him. An early assessment stating that the CIA's knowledge of his war record "rests almost entirely on his own unsupported statements," also refers to him as "self-seeking, egoistical, and a man of shifting loyalties." Other memos referred to him as a "shady character" and suggested he be held with a "tight rein." The CIA possessed evidence linking von Bolschwing to Eichmann and the high echelons of the SS. A source believed to be reliable fingered him as a member of the SD, and another source in Poland identified him as the SS's top man in working with the Romanian Iron Guard. Nevertheless, the CIA decided to use his services, with one assessment claiming that his past Nazi Party membership was "relatively inconsequential, particularly in view of the subject's excellent service on our behalf."

In 1950, the Austrian government inquired about von Bolschwing due to war crimes suspicions, and the CIA rushed to shield him from potential prosecution. The Austrians were told that there was "no file available" on him. A few years later, after he had run into visa problems, the CIA tried to help him gain Austrian citizenship. When this proved unsuccessful, the CIA decided to help him emigrate to the United States. The CIA helped expedite his application for a US visa, withheld information from the US State Department about his Nazi past, and booked tickets for him and his wife on a luxury cruise ship voyage to the US. When von Bolschwing and his wife arrived in the US on February 2, 1954, they were met by a military intelligence officer who had worked with him in Europe, and were hosted in his Boston home for a few months. Having brought him to the US as what it saw as a reward for his service, the CIA ended its relationship with von Bolschwing, ordering him to break off all relations and to contact them only in the event of a "dire emergency" which was a "life or death situation."

In the US, von Bolschwing became the executive of a series of drug and chemical companies, and served as a consultant for projects in Germany, often traveling there for business. In 1959, he became a US citizen. He became well-connected, and was put in line for a prestigious posting as a State Department representative for international development in India.

In May 1960, von Bolschwing's former superior Adolf Eichmann, who was living in Argentina under a false identity, was abducted by Mossad agents and smuggled to the State of Israel, where he would be tried and executed. News of the abduction caused von Bolscwhing to fear that he was next. He correctly predicted that his name would come up at Eichmann's trial, and feared that a renewed probe into the Nazis' Jewish affairs office as part of the prosecution efforts would uncover his own role. Fearing that he would be prosecuted and that the Israelis might even abduct him the same way they had abducted Eichmann, he contacted one of his former handlers, expressing his fears and claiming that he was afraid for his life. The CIA, in turn, was desperate to keep their involvement with Baron von Bolschwing and his previous involvement with Eichmann a secret. West German Bundesnachrichtendienst agents who spent a month in Washington perusing US intelligence files on their own unearthed massive evidence linking von Bolschwing directly to Eichmann and the Jewish affairs office. Despite the fact that this information had been sitting unexamined in the CIA's files for years, the agency blamed his dishonesty for the humiliating predicament they now found themselves in.

The CIA agreed to protect von Bolschwing, promising that it would not turn him over to Israel and that it would withhold evidence of his past from the US Justice Department. Had the Justice Department received the evidence, it potentially could have opened deportation proceedings against him, and had he been deported, he risked prosecution in West Germany or Austria. In exchange, von Bolschwing had to renounce his candidacy for development representative in India.

In 1969 von Bolschwing was working for the California computer leasing company Trans-International Computer Investment Corporation of Sacramento, which had contracts for the Defense Department. He rose to vice-president, but his job there ended when the company became embroiled in a financial scandal, and it subsequently went bankrupt in 1971.

His wife committed suicide in 1978. The US government did not begin investigating von Bolschwing's involvement in Nazi war crimes until 1979, when his wartime record was revealed to the public. The Office of Special Investigations of the Justice Department filed charges against him in May 1981 for concealing his Nazi past and sought to deport him. His second wife stated that he had been a double agent for the Americans in Tyrol. He surrendered his American citizenship but early in 1982 the trial was delayed while he was allowed to remain in the country because he had an incurable brain disease. He died two months later, in March 1982, in a nursing home in Carmichael, California.

References

External links
 "Report des US-Justizministeriums: USA gewährten Nazis Unterschlupf", Der Spiegel, November 14, 2010

Bibliography 
 Klaus Eichner. Faschistische Ostexperten im Dienste der US-Geheimdienste"  in: Holocaust-Täter im Dienste von BND und CIA. Kominform. 6 April 2008  
 Klaus POPA. Völkisches Handbuch Südosteuropa Online Lexikon B . 3 February 2010 (pdf) p. 84 

American Cold War spymasters
1909 births
1982 deaths
People from Bartoszyce County
Romania in World War II
SS-Hauptsturmführer
Adolf Eichmann
German intelligence agencies
Cold War organizations
Cold War history of Germany
World War II spies for Germany
CIA agents convicted of crimes
Cold War spies
Holocaust perpetrators in Romania
Espionage scandals and incidents
People from East Prussia
People from Sacramento, California
Loss of United States citizenship by prior Nazi affiliation
Reich Security Main Office personnel